Pavel Helebrand (October 25, 1960, Opava) is a contemporary Czech composer known for his theatrical scores for productions including Romeo and Juliet, Pride and Prejudice and Cinderella.

References

1960 births
Czech composers
Czech male composers
Living people
People from Opava